Gangam Anikethreddy (born 28 October 2000) is an Indian cricketer. He made his first-class debut on 12 February 2020, for Hyderabad in the 2019–20 Ranji Trophy.

References

External links
 

2000 births
Living people
Indian cricketers
Hyderabad cricketers